Egaku or Hui'E  was a well-connected 9th century Japanese scholar-monk  who made frequent trips to Tang China for pilgrimage and bringing back Buddhist teachings to Japan. Egaku had a huge impact on the religious and cultural history of China and Japan. In Japan, he is famous for bringing the first Rinzai Zen monk Gikū and the works of the Chinese poet Bai Juyi to Japan. In China, he is renowned for his role in establishing a developed pilgrimage site in Putuoshan, one of the four major Buddhist pilgrimage sites in China.

Life
Unlike his monastic contemporaries Saichō, Kūkai and Ennin, Egaku did not leave any travel diaries. The information known about him came from numerous Chinese and Japanese sources, and therefore, there are still many unclear points about him,  such as the dates and specific location of his birth and death.   However, he was a disciple of Saichō and possibly was an acquaintance of Kūkai.

Legacy in Japan
Egaku did not travel to Tang China as part of an official mission from Japan in contrast to some of his monastic contemporaries.  However, his travel was on the personal behest of the Empress Dowager Tachibana Kachiko, a devout Buddhist with religious and literary renown, who was curious about Zen Buddhism after talking to Kūkai.  Egaku after that went on several trips to Tang China, most of them on behalf of the Empress Dowager.

In 841 CE, Egaku went to Tang China on a pilgrimage to Mount Wutai, the bodhimaņḍa of Manjuśri Bodhisattva.  From there, he traveled to Hangzhou where he visited and offered gifts from the Empress Dowager to Yanguan Qi'an, a renowned 9th generation Chan Buddhist master descended from Mazu Daoyi. Egaku then returned to Japan.

In 844 CE, Egaku went again to Tang China.  He visited and made religious offerings at Mount Wutai and Linchi Monastery;  the Empress Dowager personally made embroidered monastic robes and religious banners for this purpose.  On this trip, Egaku witnessed and personally experienced the effect of Emperor Wuzong's Huichang persecution, which delayed his return to Japan.  With the ascension of Emperor Xuanzong in 846 CE, the abuse ended, and Egaku returned with Yanguan Qi'an's chief disciple Gikū who became the first Zen master in Japan.

Aristocratic Heian society enthusiastically received Gikū's arrival in Japan as he was the first Zen monk from China who exclusively taught Zen Buddhism in Japan.   Tachibana Kachiko first housed him in the western wing of Tō-ji Temple; then moved him to Danrin Temple once it became completed. Gikū taught Zen Buddhism for several years there and then returned to Tang China.

Also in 846/847 CE, Egaku brought his hand-copied manuscript of the "Collected Works of Bai Juyi" to Japan. The poems of the famous Chinese poet Bai Juyi were already introduced earlier into Japan.  However, Egaku's copy was a complete early copy and had a significant influence on subsequent Japanese Sinitic poetry  and native literature such as The Tale of Genji and The Pillow Book.

The Kanazawa edition is a copy of Egaku's original document.  Kept initially at the Kanazawa library founded in the Kamakura period, the Kanazawa edition is no longer a complete copy.  The Kanazawa edition preserves the original form of the "Collected Works of Bai Juyi" as revised by Bai Juyi himself.  This edition also has Egaku's annotated notes, which describe the historical circumstances facing Egaku when he was copying the text.

On possibly his last trip to Tang China (863 CE), Egaku accompanied the ex-crown prince turned Buddhist monk Takaoka Shinnō into Tang China.  Takaoka Shinnō later was reputed to have attempted travel to India by ship from Guangzhou in 865 CE, in pursuit of answers to his questions related to Buddhism. Unfortunately, he reportedly died in Singapore.

Egaku also had an "agate-colored stele" made on his behalf in Suzhou's Kaiyuan Monastery by the Chinese Zen monk Qieyuan, entitled "Record of the Nation of Japan’s First Zen School." This agate stele once stood in Heian-kyō's Rashōmon, and Tōdai-ji once preserved four large fragments of this stele. The significance of this agate stele is that it was one of the few contemporaneous records describing Egaku's recruitment of Gikū as the first Zen monk to Japan.  It was one of the sources used by Kokan Shiren to write the Egaku article found in Japan's earliest Buddhist history, the Genkō Shakusho.

Legacy in China

In 863 Egaku went again on a pilgrimage to Mount Wutai. This time, he saw a wooden statue of Avalokiteśvara Bodhisattva with an elegant and refined appearance and an ever-joyful face while on a trip to a temple located in the central peak of Mount Wutai.  Egaku wished to take this statue back to Japan and asked for the monks’ permission.  The monks acquiesced to his request. He brought the statue to Ningbo's Kaiyuan Monastery on a palanquin, located the merchant Zhang Youxing's ship, and prepared to leave for Japan.  However, the statue became extremely heavy, and he was unable to bring it onto the ship.  Egaku succeeded in bringing the statue aboard the ship only with the combined efforts of numerous merchants from Silla. The boat then set sailed and approached the waters near Putuoshan where huge angry waves and violent winds impeded its progress.  The ship went aground on Silla Reef  and then it drifted to the Cave of Tidal Sounds.  Egaku that evening had a dream where he saw a foreign monk who told him, "If you place me on this mountain, I will command the winds to send you on your way." Egaku told everyone aboard of his dream, and everyone was astonished.  Still, they came ashore and built a straw hut to place the statue of Avalokiteśvara Bodhisattva.  After making farewell obeisance to the statue, they boarded the ship and left for Japan.  An inhabitant of Putuoshan surname Zhang witnessed these events and enshrined the statue in his house for worship. After his death, they built the first permanent shrine to Guanyin Bodhisattva on Putuoshan in 916 CE, named "Unwilling to Leave Guanyin Temple." Later generations of worshipers honored Egaku as the founder of the Avalokiteśvara bodhimanda on Putuoshan.    Putuoshan now has an "Master Egaku Commemorative Hall" with a shrine dedicated to Egaku and thirty-three manifestations of Avalokitesvara located at Xifang Jingyuan, the temple next to Guanyin Leaps

Modern Discoveries
Archaeologists discovered a stone dharani pillar decorated with three entwining dragons and engraved with the text of the Uṣṇīṣa Vijaya Dhāraṇī Sūtra in Kyoto's Anshō-ji Temple in 1953.  Egaku brought this column back to Japan either in 841 or 842 CE.  One can see the column on display at the Kyoto National Museum.

Movies
In the acclaimed 2013 movie Avalokitesvara, a loose adaptation of the Putuoshan genesis story, Nagaizumi Hideo starred as Egaku.

Notes

References

Sources

Further reading
 

9th-century Japanese people
Japanese Buddhist clergy
Year of birth uncertain
Year of death uncertain
Tendai Buddhist monks
Zen Buddhist monks
People of Heian-period Japan
Buddhism in China
Tang dynasty Buddhist monks
Heian period Buddhist clergy